Pin Hook is an unincorporated community located in northeast Lamar County, east of Paris, Texas.

Notable persons
 William A. Owens, author, educator and folklorist.

References
References:
William A Owens, This Stubborn Soil, New York, Scribner [1966]

External links
 The Handbook of Texas Online

Unincorporated communities in Texas